Hocalar is a town of Afyonkarahisar Province in the Aegean region of Turkey. It is the seat of Hocalar District. Its population is 2,216 (2021). The mayor is Mustafa Akın (MHP).

References

Populated places in Afyonkarahisar Province
Towns in Turkey
Hocalar District